"Strawberry Letter 23" is a 1971 song written and composed by Shuggie Otis from his 1971 album Freedom Flight. It is also widely known by the 1977 cover version recorded by the Brothers Johnson and produced by Quincy Jones.

History 
The song's chorus says "Strawberry Letter 22" instead of the actual title of the song. This is because the premise of the song is that a couple is exchanging love letters in musical form. The singer is creating "Strawberry Letter 23" as a reply to the song he has received from his lover, and he refers to her previous message as "Strawberry Letter 22" when replying.

The Brothers Johnson version
George Johnson, of the Brothers Johnson, was dating one of Otis's cousins when he came across the 1971 album Freedom Flight. The group then recorded "Strawberry Letter 23" for their 1977 album Right on Time, which was produced by Quincy Jones, and the album went platinum. Their rendition hit the Billboard Hot 100 and peaked at number five and reached number one on the Soul Singles chart in 1977. Studio guitar player Lee Ritenour recreated Otis' original guitar solo for the Brothers Johnson cover. The 12" single was pressed on red strawberry-scented vinyl. The 7" single was originally released in a strawberry-scented sleeve.

Chart performance

Weekly charts

Year-end charts

Legacy 
Pitchfork chose the Brothers Johnson version as the 134th best song of the 1970s.

Soundtrack appearances
 The song is heard very briefly in the Quentin Tarantino 1994 film Pulp Fiction as Jules and Vincent walk down the hallway of an apartment building.
 The song is played at length in the Quentin Tarantino 1997 film Jackie Brown and is featured on the movie soundtrack album.
 The song can also be heard in the TV series Six Feet Under (2001–2005), Season 5, Episode 9 "Ecotone" (July 31, 2005).
 The song is featured in Nip/Tuck (2003–2010) Season 3, Episode #2 "Kiki" (September 27, 2005).
 The Shuggie Otis version can be heard on the 2005 film Munich.

Sampling
The track, specifically its main melody, has been in music sampling over 90 times, including:
 The Vic Reeves cover song "Born Free" from his 1991 album I Will Cure You.
 The Negativland song "White Rabbit and a Dog Named Gidget" from their 1989 album Helter Stupid.
 The First Light song "Loving You" from their 1989 album You Had It All.
 The Silk song "Baby It's You" from their 1992 album Lose Control.
 The DJ Quik song "Safe + Sound" from his 1995 album Safe + Sound.
 The St. Lunatics 1996 single "Gimme What U Got".
 The Das EFX song "Whut Goes Around" from their 1998 album Generation EFX.
 The Messy Marv's & Mitchy Slick song On the One featuring Yukmouth from their 2007 album Messy Slick.
 The Girl Talk song "Oh No" from his 2010 album All Day.
 The Justice song "Canon" from their 2011 album Audio, Video, Disco.
 The Xavier Naidoo & Kool Savas song "X.A.V.A.S".
 The Big Sean & Metro Boomin song "No Hearts, No Love" from their 2017 album Double or Nothing.

Interpolations
Parts of the song, especially the distinctive, rhythmic melody of the song's verse, have also been imitated or interpolated in other songs:
 The Color Me Badd #1 R&B hit "I Wanna Sex You Up" (1992)
 The OutKast hit "Ms. Jackson" (2001)
 The Westside Connection song "Gangsta Nation" (2003)
 The Beyoncé song "Be with You", from the album Dangerously in Love (2003)
 The Justin Timberlake song "Señorita" (2003)
 The Coheed and Cambria song "The Running Free", from the album Good Apollo, I'm Burning Star IV, Volume Two: No World for Tomorrow (2007)
 The Julian Perretta single "Wonder Why" (2010)
 The Pretty Lights song "Rainbows and Waterfalls" (2017)

Tevin Campbell version

"Strawberry Letter 23" is the fifth single from R&B singer Tevin Campbell's 1992 debut studio album T.E.V.I.N.. It peaked at #53 on the Hot 100 and #40 on the R&B charts. The Tevin Campbell version is more up-tempo, with a new jack swing beat, and includes a rap that mentions "the letter 23."

Track listings
US Promo CD
 Strawberry Letter 23 (Album Edit w/o Rap) 	3:48 	
 Strawberry Letter 23 (Album Version) 	4:07 	
 Strawberry Letter 23 (Single Remix w/Rap) 	4:15 	
 Strawberry Letter 23 (Single Remix w/o Rap) 	3:35

US Maxi-CD
 Strawberry Letter 23 (QDIII Mix Without Rap) 	3:45 	
 Strawberry Letter 23 (QDIII Mix With Rap) 	4:12 	
 Strawberry Letter 23 (QDIII Fat Choice Mix) 	4:48 	
 Strawberry Letter 23 (Album Edit Without Rap) 	3:24 	
 Strawberry Letter 23 (Soul Mix With Rap) 	4:15 	
 Strawberry Letter 23 (T.C.'s Choice) 	4:04 	
 Strawberry Letter 23 (Soul Mix Without Rap) 	3:35 	
 Strawberry Letter 23 (Club Mix) 	6:28 	
 Strawberry Letter 23 (Club Dub) 	5:58 	
 Strawberry Letter 23 (Naughty Beats) 	4:42

Charts

Other covers

 An instrumental version was done by Phil Upchurch on his 1978 album Phil Upchurch around the same time as the Brothers Johnson version, which is a more upbeat funky version.
 The Scottish band Pop Wallpaper released Strawberry Letter 23, "remodelled /.../ for the dance floor", as a single in 1986, with Audrey Redpath on vocals.
 The short-lived R&B duo Kiara included a cover version of the song on its 1988 album To Change and/or Make a Difference, which peaked at #23 on the Billboard R&B Albums chart.
 Digital Underground did a hip hop version in the early 1990s and it is included on their 1999 album The Lost Files.
 Quincy Jones, who produced the Brothers Johnson's version, covered the song himself, with singer Akon, on the album Q: Soul Bossa Nostra (2010).
 Saxophonist Jessy J covered the song on her album My One and Only One (2015).
 Malaysian singer Yuna recorded the song for a commercial for Swedish fashion retailer H&M starring Ukrainian-Canadian model Daria Werbowy that aired in March 2015.
 In June 2015, Faith No More covered a large portion of the song during an interlude during "Midlife Crisis" at the Pinkpop festival and also at Download Festival.
 On July 22, 2017, Phish covered the song during its "Baker's Dozen" run of shows at Madison Square Garden, during the "Strawberry" themed night of that run. The song made its second appearance during the band's Fall 2018 Tour run at the Hampton Coliseum in Virginia, and it was performed again during the band's Summer 2019 Tour at the BB&T Pavilion in New Jersey. It was later performed by Phish on December 6, 2019, at the North Charleston Coliseum in South Carolina, and August 3, 2021, at the Ascend Amphitheater in Nashville.  Phish played again on June 4th, 2022 at Deer Creek in Noblesville, Indiana.
 CeeLo Green performed a cover version of the song as the voice of the giant panda Shuggie in the premiere episode of The Proud Family: Louder and Prouder.

References

External links
 

Songs about letters (message)
1977 singles
1992 singles
The Brothers Johnson songs
Tevin Campbell songs
Psychedelic soul songs
Song recordings produced by Quincy Jones
1971 songs
A&M Records singles
Qwest Records singles
Warner Records singles
2010 singles